Long Creek is a salt-water channel running roughly north from South Oyster Bay toward Freeport, New York.

Crossings 
It is spanned by the Long Creek Bridge.

Gallery

References

External links 

 Long Creek Bridge on bridgehunter.com

Channels of New York (state)
Bodies of water of Nassau County, New York